Dmitry Baiduk (born 3 August 1996) is a Belarusian professional footballer who plays for Znicz Biała Piska.

References

External links 
 
 

1996 births
Living people
Belarusian footballers
Belarusian expatriate footballers
Expatriate footballers in Poland
Association football midfielders
FC BATE Borisov players
FC Smolevichi players
FC Belshina Bobruisk players
FC Gorodeya players
FC Dynamo Brest players